WSHD and WSHD-LP (91.7 and 93.3 FM) are high school radio stations licensed to Shead Memorial High School in Eastport, Maine, United States. The stations serve the areas of Eastport, Lubec, Whiting, Pleasant Point, Perry, Pembroke, and Robbinston. The stations play a very wide variety of music and informational programming. They offer opportunities for students to learn about radio and have their own radio shows. There is also a schedule of live DJ shows hosted by various members of the communities of Eastport and the surrounding area; live DJ programming is only aired on the 93.3 frequency.

History

References

External links
Shead High School's website
 
 

SHD
High school radio stations in the United States
Mass media in Washington County, Maine
Eastport, Maine
Radio stations established in 1983
SHD-LP